Lieutenant Henry Eric Dolan  (20 January 1896 – 12 May 1918) was a World War I flying ace credited with seven aerial victories.

Biography
Henry Eric Dolan was born in England, a son of Alfred Archer Dolan, a mining engineer and Violet Eliza Edgeworth ( Hanrick) Dolan. Dolan's parents later lived at Banbury, Oxfordshire. Henry had a brother, Gerald Roberts Dolan. Educated at Downside School, he moved to Canada. Soon after the outbreak of WWII, he enlisted in the Canadian Expeditionary Force. On 20 November 1914 he was commissioned as a temporary second lieutenant in the Royal Field Artillery, and was  promoted to temporary lieutenant on 31 January 1916. He was awarded the Military Cross on 1 January 1917.

On 31 August 1917 he was appointed a flying officer in the Royal Flying Corps, and transferred to the General List. In early 1918 he was posted to No. 74 Squadron, which operated Royal Aircraft Factory SE.5as on the Western Front. He was assigned to 'A' Flight, under the leadership of "Mick" Mannock. Dolan scored his first victory when he shot down an Albatros D.V near Merville on 12 April 1918. He scored steadily throughout the following month, notching his seventh triumph on 11 May. 

The following day, Dolan fell under the guns of Raven Freiherr von Barnekow. He is buried in plot II, row D, grave 8 at La Laiterie Military Cemetery, Heuvelland, West Flanders, Belgium.

References

1896 births
1918 deaths
People from Hastings
People educated at Downside School
Canadian Expeditionary Force soldiers
Royal Field Artillery officers
Royal Flying Corps officers
Royal Air Force personnel of World War I
British World War I flying aces
Recipients of the Military Cross
British military personnel killed in World War I